Santi Jacopo e Cristoforo is a small Roman Catholic church or chapel located in the village of Bolgheri, in the municipality of Castagneto Carducci, province of Livorno, Tuscany, Italy.

History
A church of this name was located inside the town castle by about the year 1000. The Antipope Nicholas V took refuge here in 1329. After the castle was destroyed in 1492, the present church was erected 1505-1515 using stones from this castle. One wall derives from medieval construction. The church is dedicated to San Jacopo Baronto of Pistoia. The stone church underwent a major restoration in 1902 patronized by count Alberto Guido. The portal has a marble crest of the Della Gherardesca family. The interior has faux marble decoration, while the entrance to the sacristy has depictions of the titular saints.

References

16th-century Roman Catholic church buildings in Italy
Roman Catholic churches completed in 1515
Churches in the province of Livorno